Abyssothyris is a genus of brachiopods belonging to the family Dyscoliidae.

Species:

Abyssothyris briggsi 
Abyssothyris wyvillei

References

Brachiopod genera
Terebratulida